The ICA IAR-35 is a Romanian glider designed and built in the 1980s primarily for aerobatics, though capable of general purpose use. Several production prototypes were constructed.

Design and development
The IAR-35 is an all-metal, single seat, short span glider developed for aerobatic flight.  Its three spar shoulder wing, with metal ribs and bonded metal skinning, has a constant chord centre section and tapered outer panels.  There is no dihedral on the centre section but 2° outboard.  The whole trailing edge is occupied by all-metal, statically balanced ailerons, each fitted with an automatic trim tab.  DFS (Schempp-Hirth) airbrakes extend both above and below the wings.

Its fuselage is a metal semi-monocoque with aluminium alloy framing and duralumin skin.  The cockpit is ahead of the wing with the pilot under a long, single piece Perspex canopy.  On the underside, below the wing there is a monowheel, fitted with a brake, which retracts behind a pair of doors.  The IAR-35 also has a fixed, semi-recessed tailwheel and a skid under the nose. The wing tips are protected by small, sprung balance wheels.  Its fuselage becomes more slender behind the wing, mounting a conventional empennage with tall, straight edged, swept vertical surfaces and a dorsal fillet.  The rudder is statically balanced and has a vertical trailing edge. A braced tailplane is mounted forward on the fin, a little above the fuselage, carrying similarly balanced elevators fitted with trim tabs.

The IAR-35 first flew in May 1986.  Only a few were built but four remained on the Romanian civil register in 2010.

Specifications

References

1980s Romanian sailplanes
Aircraft first flown in 1986
Shoulder-wing aircraft